The Grande Messe des morts (or Requiem), Op. 5, by Hector Berlioz was composed in 1837. The Grande Messe des Morts is one of Berlioz's best-known works, with a tremendous orchestration of woodwind and brass instruments, including four antiphonal offstage brass ensembles. The work derives its text from the traditional Latin Requiem Mass. It has a duration of approximately ninety minutes, although there are faster recordings of under seventy-five minutes.

History
In 1837, Adrien de Gasparin, the Minister of the Interior of France, asked Berlioz to compose a Requiem Mass to remember soldiers who died in the Revolution of July 1830. Berlioz accepted the request, having already wanted to compose a large orchestral work. Meanwhile, the orchestra was growing in size and quality, and the use of woodwinds and brass was expanding due to the increasing ease of intonation afforded by modern instruments. Berlioz later wrote, "if I were threatened with the destruction of the whole of my works save one, I should crave mercy for the Messe des morts." That performance to commemorate the soldiers who died in the 1830 Revolution was cancelled. Soon a ceremony commemorating the death of General Damrémont and the soldiers killed at the Siege of Constantine provided the occasion for the premiere at Les Invalides, conducted by François Habeneck on 5 December 1837

In his Mémoires, Berlioz claimed that at the premiere of the work, conductor François Habeneck put down his baton during the dramatic "Tuba mirum" (part of the "Dies irae" movement) while he took a pinch of snuff, prompting the composer to rush to the podium to conduct the rest of the work himself, thereby saving the performance from disaster. The premiere was a complete success.

Berlioz revised the work twice in his life, first in 1852, making the final revisions in 1867, only two years before his death.

Structure

Berlioz's Requiem has ten movements, and the structure is as follows:
Introit
1. Requiem aeternam & Kyrie: Introitus
Sequence
2. Dies irae: Prosa, Tuba mirum
3. Quid sum miser
4. Rex tremendae
5. Quaerens me
6. Lacrimosa
Offertory
7. Domine Jesu Christe
8. Hostias
9. Sanctus
10. Agnus Dei

Instrumentation
The Requiem is scored for a very large orchestra, including four brass choirs at the corners of the stage, and chorus:

Woodwinds
4 flutes
2 oboes
2 cors anglais
4 clarinets in B
8 bassoons

Brass
12 horns (4 parts + 2 extra in Mvt 2, in D, E, A, and C)
4 cornets in B
4 tubas

Percussion
16 timpani (6 pairs, 4 single)
2 bass drums
10 pairs of cymbals
4 tam-tams

4 brass choirs
Orchestra 1 to the North
4 cornets
4 trombones
2 tubas
Orchestra 2 to the East
4 trumpets (in E)
4 trombones
Orchestra 3 to the West
4 trumpets (in D)
4 trombones
Orchestra 4 to the South
4 trumpets (in C)
4 trombones
4 ophicleides (usually substituted by tubas)

Voices
Chorus:
80 sopranos and altos (exact ratio not specified)
60 tenors
70 basses

Tenor solo

Strings
25 violin I
25 violin II
20 violas
20 violoncellos
18 double basses

In relation to the number of singers and strings, Berlioz indicates in the score that, "The number [of performers] indicated is only relative. If space permits, the chorus may be doubled or tripled, and the orchestra be proportionally increased. But in the event of an exceptionally large chorus, say 700 to 800 voices, the entire chorus should only be used for the "Dies irae", the "Tuba mirum", and the "Lacrimosa", the rest of the movements being restricted to 400 voices."

The work premiered with over four hundred performers.

Music
The Requiem opens with rising scales in the strings, horns, oboes, and cors anglais preceding the choral entry. The first movement contains the first two sections of the music for the Mass (the Introit and the Kyrie).

The Sequence commences in the second movement, with the "Dies irae" portraying Judgement Day. There are three choral sections each followed by a modulation to the next section. Following the third modulation, the four brass ensembles, specified by Berlioz to be placed at the corners of the stage but more commonly deployed throughout the hall, first appear with a fortissimo E major chord, later joined by 16 timpani, two bass drums, and four tam-tams. The loud flourish is followed by the choral entry, "Tuba mirum", a powerful unison statement by the chorus basses at the top of their register, followed by the rest of the choir. There is a recapitulation of the fanfare, heralding the coming of the Last Judgment ("Judex ergo") by the full choir in canon at the octave. The choir whispers with woodwinds and strings to end the movement.

The third movement, "Quid sum miser", is short, depicting after Judgement Day, featuring an orchestration of TTB chorus, two cors anglais, eight bassoons, cellos, and double basses. The "Rex tremendae" features the second entry of the brass choirs, and contains contrasting dynamics from the choir. "Quaerens me" is a quiet a cappella movement.

The sixth movement, "Lacrimosa", is in  time signature, concluding the Sequence section of the Mass, is the only movement written in recognizable sonata form. The dramatic effect of this movement is heightened by the gradual addition of the massed brass and percussion.

The seventh movement begins the Offertory. "Domine Jesu Christe" opens as a quiet orchestral fugue based on a quasi-modal motif in D minor. The fugue is overlaid with a repeated three-note motif: A, B, and A from the choir, pleading for mercy at the judgment. The choral statements of this motive interweave with the developing orchestral texture for about ten minutes almost to the end, which concludes peacefully. The concluding part of the Offertory, the "Hostias", is short and scored for the male voices, eight trombones, three flutes, and strings.

The ninth movement, the "Sanctus", in D major, employs a solo tenor voice accompanied by long held notes from the flute and muted strings. Hushed women's voices echo the solo lines. A brisk fugue for full choir and orchestra ("Hosanna in excelsis") follows. The whole is repeated with the addition of pianissimo cymbal and bass drum to the "Sanctus" and a much expanded "Hosanna" fugue. Berlioz suggested that the solo part could be sung by ten tenors. The final movement, containing the "Agnus Dei" and Communion sections of the Mass, features long held chords by the woodwinds and strings. The movement recapitulates melodies and effects from previous movements including the "Hostias" and the "Introit".

Notable recordings

References

Sources
 Steinberg, Michael. "Hector Berlioz: Requiem." Choral Masterworks: A Listener's Guide. Oxford: Oxford University Press, 2005, 61–67.

Further reading
Niecks, Frederick. "Berlioz's Messe des Morts and Its Performance in Glasgow". The Musical Times and Singing Class Circular 25, no. 493 (1 March 1884): 129–31.

External links

 
Free scores of this work in the Choral Public Domain Library (ChoralWiki)
*"The Berlioz Requiem – Pre-Concert Talk", lecture by David Cairns at Gresham College on 12 July 2007

Compositions by Hector Berlioz
1837 compositions
Berlioz
Spatial music